Yacoub Zaiadeen (1922 - 5 April 2015) was a Jordanian politician and surgeon.

Zaiadeen was born in Samakeieh in Karak Governorate. He completed his secondary education in Salt and moved to Damascus to study law. He later dropped the study of law and pursued a degree in medicine in Beirut.

After completing his degree Zaiadeen moved to Jerusalem where he worked as a surgeon. He was elected to the Jordanian House of Representatives for Jerusalem in 1956. He served as Secretary General of the Jordanian Communist Party.

Zaiadeen died on 5 April 2015, aged 95.

References

1922 births
2015 deaths
Year of birth uncertain
Jordanian Communist Party politicians
Jordanian surgeons
Members of the House of Representatives (Jordan)
People from Karak Governorate